Lee Da-hee (born March 15, 1985) is a South Korean model and actress. Her breakout role was in the 2013 SBS courtroom drama I Can Hear Your Voice. She is also known for her role as Kang Sa-ra in The Beauty Inside (2018) and Cha Hyeon in Search: WWW (2019).

Career 
At the age of 17, Lee Da-hee competed in the 2002 SBS , where she was a finalist. She began her acting career by playing supporting roles in television dramas, including The Legend, Birdie Buddy, and Secret Love, and in films, including Harmony.

Lee's breakout year was 2013, when she appeared in the hit courtroom drama I Can Hear Your Voice. This was followed by her first leading role in a television drama, the 2014 revenge drama Big Man. Her popularity increased further when she appeared in the 2015 drama Mrs. Cop. In 2016, Lee signed with the talent agency Huayi Brothers.

In 2018, Lee starred in the hit romantic comedy series The Beauty Inside. In 2019, Lee was cast as one of three female leads in the romance drama Search: WWW alongside Lee Jae-wook. On July 3, she was announced as a host for the girl group reality series Queendom alongside Jang Sung-kyu, and premiered in late August.

On March 11, 2020, she was announced as a host, alongside Jang Sung-kyu, for the upcoming Mnet boy group reality series Road to Kingdom, which is the sequel to Queendom.

In November 2022, Lee signed with Ghost Studio.

Filmography

Film

Television series

Web series

Television show

Web show

Music video

Hosting

Discography

Singles

Awards and nominations

References

External links
 
 
 

South Korean television actresses
1985 births
Living people
South Korean film actresses
South Korean web series actresses